James Marne Kumar Maitland (18 December 1914 – March 1992) was an Anglo-Indian character actor in films and television programmes.

Biography
Maitland was born in Calcutta, and educated at Bedales School before going up to Magdalene College, Cambridge, where he took a BA in 1936. He served in the Royal Artillery during the Second World War, commissioned as a second lieutenant on 20 November 1941. He made his film debut in Cairo Road (1950). His sharp, dark features and small stature saw him typecast as villains from the Middle and Far East, particularly for Hammer Film Productions. The Man with the Golden Gun (1974) was his one appearance in a James Bond film.

He made numerous television appearances in programmes such as The Buccaneers, Danger Man, The Avengers (as a sinister Eastern delegate in the 1967 episode "Death's Door"), The Saint, The Champions, Department S, and Randall and Hopkirk, and the Granada series The Jewel in the Crown (1984, as Pandit Baba, a scholar agitating for an end to British rule in India).

Maitland died in March 1992.

Filmography

 Cairo Road (1950) .... Gohari
 Outcast of the Islands (1951) .... Ships Mate
 Deadly Nightshade (1953) .... Heinz
 South of Algiers (1953) .... Thankyou
 Saadia (1953) .... Horse dealer
 Flame and the Flesh (1954) .... Filiberto
 Father Brown (1954) .... Maharajah
 Diplomatic Passport (1954) .... Phlip
 Svengali (1954) .... 2nd Stage Manager
 Break in the Circle (1955) .... The phony Kudnic
 The Dark Avenger (1955) .... French Peasant (uncredited)
 Ramsbottom Rides Again (1956) .... (uncredited)
 Bhowani Junction (1956) .... Govindaswami
 Hour of Decision (1956) ..... Club Waiter
 Interpol (1957) .... Guido Martinelli
 Seven Thunders (1957) .... Hassan (uncredited)
 Windom's Way (1957) .... Commissioner Belhedron
 The Mark of the Hawk (1957) .... Sandar Lai
 The Camp on Blood Island (1958) .... Capt. Sakamura
 The Wind Cannot Read (1958) .... Bahadur
 Man with a Gun (1958) .... Max
 I Was Monty's Double (1958) .... Arab Proprietor
 I Only Arsked! (1958) .... King Fazim
 Tiger Bay (1959) .... Dr. Das
 Dial 999 (TV series) - ('An Inside Job', episode 33) -(1959) ....Kirk
 Carlton-Browne of the F.O. (1959) .... Archipolagos (uncredited)
 I'm All Right Jack (1959) .... Mr. Mohammed
 The Stranglers of Bombay (1959) .... Patel Shari
 Cone of Silence (1960) .... MR. Robinson
 Sands of the Desert (1960) .... Advisor to Sheikh
 The Terror of the Tongs (1961) .... Beggar
 Passport to China (1961) .... Han Po
 Three on a Spree (1961) .... Eastern gentleman
 Middle Course (1961) .... Renard
 The Phantom of the Opera (1962) .... Xavier
 Panic (1963) .... Lantern
 Nine Hours to Rama (1963) .... Karnick
 Master Spy (1963) .... Dr. Asafu
 Sammy Going South (1963) .... Hassan
 Cleopatra (1963) .... Ephranor
 First Men in the Moon (1964) .... Dr. Tok,UN Space Agency (uncredited) 
 Lord Jim (1965) .... Elder
 The Return of Mr. Moto (1965) .... Wasir Hussein, the Shahrdar's Assistant
 The Reptile (1965) .... The Malay
 Khartoum (1966) .... Sheikh Osman
 The Bobo (1967) .... Luiz Castillo
 Duffy (1968) .... Abdul
 Decline and Fall... of a Birdwatcher (1968) .... Junior Policeman
 The Shoes of the Fisherman (1968) .... Cardinal Rahamani
 Journey to Midnight (1968) .... Edward Chardur (episode 'The Indian Spirit Guide')
 The Bushbaby (1969) .... The Hadj
 Anne of the Thousand Days (1969) .... Cardinal Campeggio
 The Statue (1971) .... UNO Secretary General
 Roma (1972) .... Guide in the Catacombs
 Man of La Mancha (1972) .... Captain of the Guard
 Shaft in Africa (1973) .... Col. Gonder
 Massacre in Rome (1973) .... Pancrazio's secretary (uncredited)
 Street Law (1974) .... Records (uncredited)
 The Man with the Golden Gun (1974) .... Mr. Lazar
 Down the Ancient Staircase (1975)
 The Pink Panther Strikes Again (1976) .... Deputy Commissioner Lasorde (scenes deleted)
 March or Die (1977) .... Leon
 Ashanti (1979) .... Touraeg Chief
 Lovers and Liars (1979)
 The Black Stallion (1979) .... Drake Captain
 Grog (1982)
 Trail of the Pink Panther (1982) .... Deputy Commissioner Lasorde
 Pope John Paul II (1984) .... Mountain Sacristian
 The Scarlet and the Black (1983).....Papal Secretary    
 Memed, My Hawk (1984) .... Suleyman
 The Assisi Underground (1985) .... Rabbi
 I Am an ESP (1985) 
 The Belly of an Architect (1987) .... Battistino
 Appointment in Liverpool (1988) .... Pilar
 Stradivari (1988) .... Doctor
 And the Violins Stopped Playing (1988) .... Sandu Mirga, Dymitr's father
 A Violent Life (1990) .... Blind cardinal
 The King's Whore (1990) .... Count Trevie (final film role)

References

External links
 
 Little Margaret Movie
Maitland tribute on YouTube

1914 births
1992 deaths
British male stage actors
British male film actors
British male television actors
Male actors from Kolkata
Anglo-Indian people
Alumni of Magdalene College, Cambridge
British Army personnel of World War II
20th-century British male actors
People educated at Bedales School
Royal Artillery officers